"One Wish" is the first single from Ray J's third album Raydiation. Released in July 2005, the Darkchild produced track became a national hit, peaking at #11 on the Billboard Hot 100 singles chart on January 17, 2006. It became Ray J's first single to reach the Top 20. The song was notably sampled by Burial for his song Archangel from Untrue, his second and most recent album.

Track listing 
UK CD Single (2005)
 "One Wish" [Album Version]
 "One Wish" [Parabeats Remix]
 "Keep Sweatin'" (Featuring Fat Joe) [Album Version]
 "One Wish" [Video]

UK 12" Vinyl Single (2005)
 "One Wish" [Album Version] 
 "One Wish" [Instrumental] 
 "One Wish" [A Cappella] 
 "One Wish" [Parabeats Remix] 
 "One Wish" [Parabeats Instrumental]

UK CD 1 – 2-Track Single [Re-Release] (2006)
 "One Wish" [Radio Edit] 
 "One Wish" [Parabeats Remix]

UK CD 2 – Maxi Single (2006)
 "One Wish" [Radio Edit] 
 "One Wish" (Desert Storm Remix Featuring Fabolous)
 "One Wish" [Maurice Joshua Nu Soul Remix] 
 "One Wish" [Video] 
+ Biography & Picture Gallery 
+ "One Wish" [Ringtone]

Chart performance 
When the single was released in the UK on 31 October 2005, it became his highest charting solo single to date. "One Wish" peaked at #26, becoming his first top 30 hit. Despite its slight chart success the first time around, the single was re-released in the UK on 13 March 2006 with a host of new remixes. This time "One Wish" entered the UK top 20, peaking at #13.

Weekly charts

Year-end charts

References 

2004 songs
2005 singles
Ray J songs
Song recordings produced by Rodney Jerkins
Songs written by Rodney Jerkins
Songs written by LaShawn Daniels
Songs written by Fred Jerkins III
Music videos directed by Director X
Songs written by Ray J